Ebba Maria De la Gardie (1657–1697) was a Swedish poet and singer.

She was the daughter of count Pontus Fredrik De la Gardie and Beata Elisabet von Königsmarck, the sister of Johanna Eleonora De la Gardie and the cousin of Amalia Wilhelmina Königsmarck and Maria Aurora Königsmarck. She was a favorite of the Swedish Queen, Ulrika Eleonora of Denmark. She was active as a poet at the royal court and was given much attention by her contemporaries.

She participated at the amateur theatre of the royal court encouraged by the queen, Ulrika Eleonora of Denmark. In the winter of 1683-84, a group of female courtiers performed the Swedish premier of Iphigénie by Racine at court. In the play, Johanna Eleonora De la Gardie acted in the part of Iphigenie, Amalia Königsmarck as Achilles, Aurora Königsmarck as Clitemnestre, Augusta Wrangel as Agamemnon, and Ebba Maria De la Gardie as Eriphile. This is regarded as a significant event as the first play performed by an all female cast in Sweden, as an introduction of French Classicism in Sweden.

References 

 https://web.archive.org/web/20071030135817/http://historiska-personer.nu/min-s/pd78bceec.html
 Samlade vitterhetsarbeten af svenska författare från Stjernhjelm ..., Volym 18
 De la Gardie, Ebba Maria i Wilhelmina Stålberg, Anteckningar om svenska qvinnor (1864)
 De la Gardie, Ebba Maria i Herman Hofberg, Svenskt biografiskt handlexikon (andra upplagan, 1906)
 Ebba Maria De la Gardie Svenskt biografiskt lexikon (SBL)

Further reading 
 

1657 births
1697 deaths
Swedish nobility
17th-century Swedish women writers
17th-century Swedish poets
17th-century Swedish women singers
Swedish women poets
Swedish people of French descent
17th-century Swedish actresses
Swedish stage actresses
People of the Swedish Empire